Oh Ji-eun (born December 30, 1981) is a South Korean actress. She is best known for her roles in the weekend drama Three Brothers, the daily drama Smile Again, the sitcom Living Among the Rich, the entertainment industry satire The King of Dramas, and the supernatural police procedural Cheo Yong.
On 22 October 2017, she is officially married to a Korean American, whom she dated for over two years. ""

Filmography

Film

Television

Music video

Awards and nominations

References

6.^https://www.soompi.com/2017/10/22/actress-oh-ji-eun-ties-knot-private-wedding-ceremony/

External links
 
 
 
 Oh Ji-eun at Family Actors Entertainment
 
 

1981 births
IHQ (company) artists
Living people
Mystic Entertainment artists
South Korean television actresses
South Korean film actresses